The Wyandotte Echo is a legal newspaper for Kansas City, Kansas. The Wyandotte Echo is published every Wednesday. The newspaper is owned by and operated by M.R.P.P. Inc.  The Wyandotte Echo is the official newspaper for the Wyandotte County Unified Government and the 29th District of Kansas Courts.

African American attorney and Niagara Movement co-founder Isaac F. "I.F." Bradley, Sr. (1862 – 1938) published and edited the paper, from 1930, until his death, in 1938.

References

Newspapers published in Kansas
Publications established in 1933
Legal newspapers